Abele may refer to:

 Abele (village), a small village or hamlet in the city of Poperinge, in the Belgian province of West-Flanders
 Abele (surname)
 Abele, tropical cyclone, 2010
 Abelé, a Champagne house
Abele (opera), an Italian play by Vittoria Alfieri
 USS Abele (AN-58), an American Ailanthus-class net laying ship 
 USS Mannert L. Abele (DD-733), American Allen M. Sumner-class destroyer
 Populus alba, the white poplar, a tree species
 Abelian variety
 Abele, Polish name for the municipality of Obeliai, Lithuania

See also 
 Abel (disambiguation)
 Abell (disambiguation)
 Abels (disambiguation)
 Able (disambiguation)
 Abeles, a surname